G. darwinii may refer to:
 Gephyroberyx darwinii, the Darwin's slimehead, a slimehead fish species in the genus Gephyroberyx
 Gossypium darwinii, a cotton plant species found only on the Galapagos Islands
 Gymnodactylus darwinii, Gray, 1845, a gecko species in the genus Gymnodactylus

See also
 G. darwini (disambiguation)
 Darwinii (disambiguation)